John Douglas Craton (born August 6, 1953) is an American classical composer. His works have been performed throughout the United States, Europe, and Japan. While his compositions cover a diverse range, he is best known for his operas, ballets, and works for classical mandolin.

Biography
Craton was born August 6, 1953, in Anniston, Alabama. Though neither of his parents was musical, his extended family included many musicians, both amateurs and professionals, among them his cousin, concert pianist and composer Barbara Gallagher. He began his formal musical training at age 10 studying violin under retired violinist and conductor, Robert Louis Barron. After graduating from Saks High School he studied violin and piano at Jacksonville State University before transferring to Lipscomb University, where he earned his B.A. Craton studied theory and composition under John Maltese, Gerald Moore, and Henry Fusner. His graduate degree from Indiana University Bloomington was in audiology, and Craton practiced as a clinical audiologist for several years in Indiana before returning to his musical roots and devoting his full-time to teaching and composing.

Craton's music is highly tonal and in general reflects a style of English pastoralism, often incorporating onomatopoeic elements sometimes described as "nature music." His music has been variously characterized as "atmospheric," "dramatic and challenging," "largely traditional ... playful," and occasionally even reflecting "a medieval/Renaissance flavor." He has been performed by such artists and ensembles as Sebastiaan de Grebber, Gertrud Weyhofen, Eva van den Dool, Christiaan Saris, Ljubomir Velickovic, Het CONSORT, the Orkest van het Oosten, Filarmonica Mandolini Alba Sapporo, Townsend Opera Players, and the Amsterdam Symphony Orchestra. Romanian opera composer and conductor Leonard Dumitriu has described Craton's music as "coming from some other time and planet," stating that although he "may be an American living in the present, ... [his] music comes from the time of Haydn and Mozart, or, better, from a world without time, where ... even the cares are easy and bright ... a musical world of sonorous peace and joy." Many of Craton's works are published by Wolfhead Music.

While in his early years Craton often performed on violin, piano, recorder, and other instruments, he abandoned public performance after a hand injury and has since devoted himself completely to teaching and composing. He currently operates a private music studio in Bedford, Indiana.

Works

Opera 
The Curious Affair of the Count of Monte Blotto
Defiance: A One-minute Opera
The Fashionable Lady
Gilgamesh
Inanna: An Opera of Ancient Sumer
The Parliament of Fowls
The Reconciliation
Saint Mary of Egypt
Tom Ojos Azules
Vasya Whitefeet

Ballet
L'Atelier du tailleur de pierre
Les chats du Bagarreau
Dans les ténèbres
La Boîte à musique
Le Grenier
Le Cimetière
The Dartmoor Pixies
Emilia  
Les gentilles sirènes
The Huluppu Tree (from Inanna)
The Jumblies
Labyrinth (pas seul)
Mother Goose
The Muleshoe Marathon
Nefertiti
Pierrot & Pierrette (aka Le mime solitaire)
La Soirée des animaux
The Tattered Slippers
Through the Looking-Glass
Voyageur de temps : un ballet électronique

Orchestral
Ann Putnam Overture
Apologetic Waltz for string orchestra
Assyrian Fantasy for violin, strings & percussion
Ava's Vignettes for string orchestra
Beowulf: The Orchestral Suite
Bloemen van Spanje (Flowers of Spain) for two guitars & strings
Cantique des montées
A Christmas Card
Coronach for the Martyrs of Our Lady of Salvation
Danseries anciennes for mandolin orchestra
Gilgamesh Overture
Inanna Orchestral Suite
Lassitude for string orchestra with solo violin & violoncello
The Legend of Princess Noccalula for mandolin & orchestra
Mongolian Folk Songs for viola & chamber orchestra
Niños Jugando for guitar & mandolin orchestra
Pagan Festivals for string orchestra
A Silly Jig for mandolin orchestra
Three Paintings by Nikolai Blokhin for violin & strings
Triptych for string orchestra

Concertos
Concerto for 2 Mandolins & Orchestra ("Rromane Bjavela")
Flute Concerto
Mandolin Concerto No. 1 in D Minor
Mandolin Concerto No. 2 in D Major
Mandolin Concerto No. 3 in E Minor
Mandolin Concerto No. 4 in G Major
Tuba Concerto in G Minor

Chamber
Les Adieux for violin & piano
Antebellum Suite for violin & piano
Autumn Leaf for flute & harp
Beowulf: A Suite for Ancient Instruments
Berceuse for violin & piano
Charon Crossing the Styx for mandolin & double bass
Dance of the Fey Folk for violin & piano
Dioses aztecas for mandolin & piano
Divertissements médiévaux for violin & piano
Duettino No. 1 in A for two violins
Duettino No. 2 in D for two violins
Duettino No. 3 in B-flat for two violins
Elementals for flute & piano
Five Apothegms for violin, horn & trombone
Five Observations for five to six instruments & voice
Four Cornish Sketches for violin & piano
Four Little Pastorales for violin & piano
Four Whimsies for mandola & mandocello
Gorillas for two violins
Les gravures de Gustave Doré for mandolin & guitar
The Gray Wolf for mandolin solo
In Memoriam: George Kirles for violoncello & piano
Kalimba Maya for kalimba solo
L'Ombre de la tour d'horloge for violoncello & piano
Perpetuum Mobile for mandolin solo
Petite Suite for violin & piano
Processional for string quartet
Quatuor pour les jeunes for string quartet
Ricordando Pi for violin & piano
Romanza for clarinet & piano
Scherzo for violin & piano
Seven Pieces in First Position for violin & piano
Seven Variations on "What If a Day, or a Month, or a Yeare" for lute or guitar
Six Easy Pieces for viola & piano
Six Pantomimes for two mandolins
Sonata Colloquia for marimba & piano
Sonata for Solo Violin
Sonate for violin, clarinet & piano ("Trois petites filles")
Sonatina for saxophone & piano
Sonatina in F for recorder & harpsichord
Sonatina No. 1 for violin & piano
Sonatina No. 2 in A Major for violin & piano
Sonatina No. 3 in G Major for violin & mandolin
Sonatina No. 4 ("Sonatina semplice") for violin & piano
Sonatina No. 5 in E Major for violin & piano
Sonatina No. 6 ("Israeli Sonatina") for violin & piano
String Quartet
Tango for four guitars & chitarrone
Three Tableaux from George MacDonald for recorder, mandolin & violoncello
Tombeau for Richard Dohrmann for violin & piano
Triosatz for three violins
Trois sœurs assyriennes for flute & piano
Twelve Variations on La Follia for violin & piano
Valse-Caprice for violin & piano
Variations from Der Fluyten Lust-hof of Jakob Van Eyck for mandolin solo
Variations on a Traditional Theme for solo violin
The Visitation for violin & piano

Piano (keyboard)
L'anneau des fees (for celesta or piano)
Bag o' Tails: A menagerie of (almost) 10 bagatelles for piano and unbreakable Native American medicine rattle
A Cat's Life
A Childhood Scrapbook
Eight Little Vignettes
Five Psalms for Organ
I Am Goya
Morris Dance (piano, 4 hands)
Nymphes (2 pianos, 4 hands)
Passacaglia for Organ
Pegasus Suite
Piano Sonata in Free Form (Hilton Head, S.C.)
Piano Sonata No. 2 in B Major
The Rennab Delgnaps Rats
Simple Pleasures
Six Little Pastorals
Six Miniatures
Southern Indiana Sketches
Where They Dwell

Vocal/choral
An Aestuary (A Calm Evening) for voice & piano
Arreglos de Canciones Tradicionales Españolas for voice & piano
Berceuse (Dodo l'enfant do) for voice & piano
A Child's Prayer at Evening for voice & piano
Jardin sentimental : Cinq poèmes d'Émile Nelligan for voice & piano
The Love Song of J. Alfred Prufrock for tenor & strings
Messe en l'honneur des martyrs modernes for SSAATTBB choir & organ
A Morning Prayer for voice & piano
Six Japanese Songs for soprano & piano
Songs for Children, Books 1, 2 & 3 for voice & piano
The Way Everlasting for SATB choir

Arrangements/orchestrations
Biber — Sonata Representativa (string orchestra)
Craton — The Armadillo Races at Victoria, Texas (wind ensemble)
Craton — Coronach for the Martyrs of Our Lady of Salvation (wind ensemble)
Craton — Lullaby (from "Four Whimsies") (string orchestra)
Daniel — Festival (soprano, mezzo-soprano & orchestra)
Daniel — Maiden of Dreams (soprano & orchestra)
Daniel — Memories of Fatherland (soprano & orchestra)
Daniel — Nineveh (soprano & orchestra)
Daniel — Spinning Wheel Song (soprano, mezzo-soprano & orchestra)
Daniel — Tears of the Beloved (mezzo-soprano & orchestra)
Dobyns — Three Rags (mandolin orchestra)
Gianneo — Cinco Piezas (solo mandolin & string orchestra)
Issabey — Qooyama (chorus & orchestra)
Issabey — Roomrama (soprano & orchestra)
Issabey — Ya Umta (chorus & orchestra)
Khofri — The Nation Sacrifices (chours & orchestra)
Khofri — The Vacant Nineveh (chorus & orchestra)
Kioulaphides — Four Souvenirs (string orchestra)
Salieri — 26 Variazioni sulla Follia di Spagna (violin & piano)

Discography
Excerpt from Gilgamesh: An Assyrian Opera — Tablet VII: "Enkidu's Death & Lament of Gilgamnesh." Gottschalk Music Center Orchestra, John Kendall Bailey, cond. Assyryt: The Assyrian Diamond CD and DVD. Assyrian Market, MN2009DVD/CD.
Excerpts from Gilgamesh: An Assyrian Opera — Overture; Tablet VI: "The Bull of Heaven." Excerpts from Inanna: An Opera of Ancient Sumer — Aria: "I, the Lady"; Ballet: "The Huluppu Tree"; Drinking Song from beginning of Act III. Sibel Demirman, Donn Bradley, Lorraine Davis, Julie Anne Miller, Barbara Wesley, vocalists; Sarah Weaver, Joseph Adkins, David Riskin, dancers of the Central West Ballet; René Daveluy, choreographer; orchestra of the Townsend Opera Players; Chase Spruill, solo violin; Ryan Murray, cond. Mediterranean Night CD and DVD. Assyrian Market, mesc-001 (CD), mesd-001 (DVD).
The Orchestral Music of John Craton. Ann Putnam Overture, Excerpts from The Parliament of Fowls, The Reconciliation, The Fashionable Lady, La Boîte à musique, and The Curious Affair of the Count of Monte Blotto; Orchestral Suite from Inanna. Wolfhead Music, 884501052672.
"The Gray Wolf." Fantasia Romantica. Sebastiaan de Grebber, mandolin. Stemra, SDG001-07.
"The Legend of Princess Noccalula." Music for Mandolin Orchestra. Sebastiaan de Grebber, solo mandolin. Het CONSORT. Alex Timmerman, conducting. Stemra ATSDG03-08.

References

External links
John Craton's Official Website
American Music Center Composer Website
Contemporary Music for Mandolin 
National Opera America Center
Wolfhead Music Composer Biography

1953 births
Living people
American male classical composers
American classical composers
American opera composers
Male opera composers
American opera librettists
People from Anniston, Alabama
Classical musicians from Alabama
Jacksonville State University alumni
Lipscomb University alumni
Indiana University Bloomington alumni
Audiologists
American classical mandolinists